Tamara G. Kolda is an American applied mathematician and former Distinguished Member of Technical Staff at Sandia National Laboratories. She is noted for her contributions in computational science, multilinear algebra, data mining, graph algorithms, mathematical optimization, parallel computing, and software engineering. She is currently a member of the SIAM Board of Trustees and served as associate editor for both the SIAM Journal on Scientific Computing and the SIAM Journal on Matrix Analysis and Applications.

Education
Kolda received her bachelor's degree in mathematics in 1992 from the University of Maryland Baltimore County and her PhD in applied mathematics from the University of Maryland College Park in 1997.

Career and research
Kolda was a Householder Postdoctoral Fellow at Oak Ridge National Laboratory from 1997 to 1999 before joining Sandia National Laboratories.

Awards and honors
Kolda received a Presidential Early Career Award for Scientists and Engineers in 2003, best paper prizes at the 2008 IEEE International Conference on Data Mining and the 2013 SIAM International Conference on Data Mining, and has been a distinguished member of the Association for Computing Machinery since 2011. She was elected a Fellow of the Society for Industrial and Applied Mathematics in 2015. She was elected a Fellow of the Association for Computing Machinery in 2019 for "innovations in algorithms for tensor decompositions, contributions to data science, and community leadership." She was elected to the National Academy of Engineering in 2020, for "contributions to the design of scientific software, including tensor decompositions and multilinear algebra".

References

Living people
American computer scientists
20th-century American mathematicians
21st-century American mathematicians
20th-century women mathematicians
21st-century women mathematicians
American women mathematicians
Applied mathematicians
American women computer scientists
University of Maryland, Baltimore County alumni
University of Maryland, College Park alumni
Oak Ridge National Laboratory people
Sandia National Laboratories people
Fellows of the Association for Computing Machinery
Fellows of the Society for Industrial and Applied Mathematics
Members of the United States National Academy of Engineering
Year of birth missing (living people)
20th-century American women
21st-century American women